Cho Yun-kyoung (born 20 August 1991) is a South Korean field hockey player for the South Korean national team.

She participated at the 2018 Women's Hockey World Cup.

References

1991 births
Living people
South Korean female field hockey players
Field hockey players at the 2018 Asian Games
Asian Games competitors for South Korea